William Howard South (died September 1777) was a political figure in Nova Scotia. He represented Halifax County in the Legislative Assembly of Nova Scotia from 1773 to 1777.

He was married twice: first to Lydia Franklyn in 1756 and then to Cicely Gafford In 1775. South was a major in the Halifax militia. He was elected to the assembly in a 1773 by-election held after John Newton's seat was declared vacant for non-attendance. South was named provost marshal for Nova Scotia in 1777 during the suspension of John Fenton. He died in office and was buried in Halifax.

References 
 

Year of birth missing
1777 deaths
Nova Scotia pre-Confederation MLAs